Angaria tyria is a species of sea snail, a marine gastropod mollusk in the family Angariidae.

Description

The shell can grow to be 40 mm to 70 mm in length.

Distribution
Angaria tyria can be found in the Southwest Pacific Ocean and off of West Australia.

References

 Poppe G.T. & Goto Y. (1993) Recent Angariidae. Ancona: Informatore Piceno. 32 pls, 10 pls.

External links

Angariidae
Gastropods described in 1842